Gaali Gopura is a 1962 Kannada-language film directed and produced by B. R. Panthulu. The film starred Rajkumar, Kalyan Kumar, Leelavathi and R. Nagendra Rao. Actor Udaya Kumar made a brief guest appearance. Acclaimed director Puttanna Kanagal had assisted Panthulu for this film.

The original score and soundtrack were composed by T. G. Lingappa and had lyrics written majorly by G. V. Iyer. A Purandara Dasa work Yaarige Yaaruntu was used in the soundtrack of the movie and was sung by Ghantasala which turned out to be a major success. B. R. Panthulu made the film simultaneously in Telugu as Gaali Medalu with N. T. Rama Rao. Both the versions were successful at the box-office.

The movie starred Rajkumar, Kalyan Kumar and Udaykumar- all 3 together for the first time in a single movie. However, Udaykumar only had a special appearance in this movie. In the same year, they went to work in full-fledge roles in single movie for the only time in their career in Bhoodana.

The film was remade in Malayalam in 1964 as Kalanjukittiya Thankam by Puttanna Kanagal who was an assistant to B. R. Panthulu.

Cast 
 Rajkumar as Krishna
 Kalyan Kumar as Mohan
 Leelavathi as Lakshmi
 M. V. Rajamma as Shantha, Krishna's foster mother & Mohan's birth mother
 Dikki Madhava Rao as Naganna, Lakshmi's Father
 Chindodi Leela as Nimmi, Mohan's wife
 R. Nagendra Rao as Govindaiah, Krishna's foster father & Mohan's birth father
 Narasimharaju as Mohan's  friend
 Balakrishna as Zamindar Kapinipathi & Nimmi's father
 K.S. Ashwath as Ranganna, Krishna's birth father
 M. N. Lakshmi Devi as Hotelier
 B. Ramadevi as Subbamma, Nimmi's mother
 Udayakumar in a special appearance. In a scene where he plays an egoistic rich person. After getting off a bus, he gives his small handbag to Krishna(Rajkumar) to carry it to the taxi stand.

Soundtrack 
The music was composed by T. G. Lingappa, lyrics by G. V. Iyer.

References

External links 
 

1960s Kannada-language films
1962 films
Films directed by B. R. Panthulu
Films scored by T. G. Lingappa
Indian black-and-white films
Kannada films remade in other languages